The Charles Lovejoy House is a historic house at 64 Broad Street in Lynn, Massachusetts.  The -story Colonial Revival mansion was built in 1893 for Doctor Charles Lovejoy, one of the founders of Lynn Hospital.  It features a Palladian entrance with pilasters topped by a triangular pediment surrounding a recessed entry.  The entry is flanked by wings that have two windows on the first floor, one on the second, and then gable-dormered windows at the top.

The house was listed on the National Register of Historic Places in 1978, and was included in the Diamond Historic District in 1996.

See also
National Register of Historic Places listings in Lynn, Massachusetts
National Register of Historic Places listings in Essex County, Massachusetts

References

Buildings and structures in Lynn, Massachusetts
Houses in Essex County, Massachusetts
National Register of Historic Places in Lynn, Massachusetts
Historic district contributing properties in Massachusetts
Houses on the National Register of Historic Places in Essex County, Massachusetts
Houses completed in 1893
Colonial Revival architecture in Massachusetts